Esther González Rodríguez (born 8 December 1992) is a Spanish professional footballer who plays as a striker for Liga F club Real Madrid and the Spain women's national team. At club level she previously played for Atlético Málaga, Sporting de Huelva and Atlético de Madrid.

International career
Esther made her senior international debut in March 2016, as a substitute in a 0–0 friendly draw with Romania in Mogoșoaia.

She played the 2009 U-17 European Championship, where Spain was the runner-up.

International goals

References

External links
 
 
 Profile at La Liga 

1992 births
Living people
Spanish women's footballers
Primera División (women) players
Levante UD Femenino players
Sportspeople from the Province of Granada
Footballers from Andalusia
Spain women's international footballers
Atlético Madrid Femenino players
Málaga CF Femenino players
Sporting de Huelva players
Women's association football forwards
UEFA Women's Euro 2022 players
UEFA Women's Euro 2017 players
21st-century Spanish women